Los Tricahues Airport,  is an airport serving Mialqui (es), a village in the  Coquimbo Region of Chile.

The airport is in a river valley, and there is nearby high terrain in all quadrants.

See also

Transport in Chile
List of airports in Chile

References

External links
OpenStreetMap - Los Tricahues
OurAirports - Los Tricahues
FallingRain - Los Tricahues Airport

Airports in Chile
Airports in Coquimbo Region